Aleki Morris-Lome (born 29 May 1994) is a New Zealand rugby union player, currently playing for the New England Free Jacks of Major League Rugby (MLR). His preferred position is centre.

Professional career
Morris-Lome signed for Major League Rugby side New England Free Jacks ahead of the 2021 Major League Rugby season.

References

External links
itsrugby.co.uk Profile

1994 births
Living people
New Zealand rugby union players
Rugby union centres
Southland rugby union players
Otago rugby union players
New England Free Jacks players